Mandelstam or Mandelshtam is a Jewish surname which may refer to:

 Leonid Mandelstam (1879–1944), Russian theoretical physicist
 Mandel'shtam (crater), lunar crater named for Leonid Mandelstam
 Nadezhda Mandelstam (1899–1980), Russian writer, wife of Osip Mandelstam
 Osip Mandelstam (1891–1938), Russian poet
 Rod Mandelstam (born 1942), South African-born tennis player
 Stanley Mandelstam (1928–2016), South African-born particle physicist
 Mandelstam variables, relativistically invariant representation for particle scattering, introduced by Stanley Mandelstam

Jewish surnames
Yiddish-language surnames